Kosmos 356 ( meaning Cosmos 356), also known as DS-U2-MG No.2, was a Soviet satellite which was launched in 1970 as part of the Dnepropetrovsk Sputnik programme. It was a  spacecraft, which was built by the Yuzhnoye Design Bureau, and was used to investigate the magnetic poles of the Earth.

Launch 
A Kosmos-2I 63SM carrier rocket was used to launch Kosmos 356 into low Earth orbit. The launch took place from Site 133/1 at the Plesetsk Cosmodrome. The launch occurred at 19:59:55 UTC on 10 August 1970, and resulted in the successful insertion of the satellite into orbit. Upon reaching orbit, the satellite was assigned its Kosmos designation, and received the International Designator 1970-059A. The North American Aerospace Defense Command assigned it the catalogue number 04487.

Orbit 
Kosmos 356 was the second of two DS-U2-MG satellites to be launched, after Kosmos 321.

References

Kosmos satellites
Spacecraft launched in 1970
1970 in the Soviet Union
Dnepropetrovsk Sputnik program